Helge Uuetoa (16 April 1936 – 16 August 2008) was an Estonian painter, illustrator, and stage and film set designer.

Career
Helge Uuetoa graduated from the Estonian State Art Institute (now, the Estonian Academy of Arts) in 1960. Afterward, she worked as a stage designer at the Estonian Drama Theatre in Tallinn from 1971 until 1977, and at the Rakvere Theatre and Eesti Televisioon from 1973 until 1988.

Death
On 16 August 2008, police were called to Uuetoa's apartment in Tallinn where they found her beaten to death. She was 72. Police subsequently arrested her son Mart (her only child), and he was charged with her murder. She was buried at the Metsakalmistu cemetery in Tallinn.

References

External links
Eesti Filmi Andmebaas

1936 births
2008 deaths
Estonian women illustrators
Estonian Academy of Arts alumni
People murdered in Estonia
Estonian murder victims
Estonian victims of crime
Burials at Metsakalmistu
20th-century Estonian painters
20th-century Estonian women artists
21st-century Estonian painters
2000s murders in Estonia
2008 crimes in Estonia
2008 murders in Europe
Matricides
Artists from Tallinn